Move Your Shadow: South Africa, Black and White, written by Joseph Lelyveld and published by Times Books in 1985, won the 1986 Pulitzer Prize for General Non-Fiction as well as the 1986 Los Angeles Times Book Prize for Current Interest.

References

External links

1985 non-fiction books
Books about apartheid
Books about South Africa
Pulitzer Prize for General Non-Fiction-winning works